The Men's finweight competition was the lightest class featured  at the 2009 World Taekwondo Championships, and was held at the Ballerup Super Arena in Copenhagen, Denmark on October 17. Finweights were limited to a maximum of 54 kilograms in body mass.

Medalists

Results
Legend
DQ — Won by disqualification
WD — Won by withdrawal

Finals

Top half

Section 1

Section 2

Bottom half

Section 3

Section 4

References
 Official Report

Men's 54